The 2005 IIHF World U18 Championship Division I were a pair of international under-18 ice hockey tournaments run by the International Ice Hockey Federation. The Division I tournaments made up the second level of competition at the 2005 IIHF World U18 Championships. The Group A tournament took place between 3 April and 9 April 2005 in Maribor, Slovenia and the Group B tournament took place between 2 April and 8 April 2005 in Sosnowiec, Poland. Belarus and Norway won the Group A and Group B tournaments respectively and gained promotion to the Championship Division for the 2006 IIHF World U18 Championships. While Great Britain finished last in Group A and Italy last in Group B and were both relegated to Division II for 2006.

Group A tournament
The Group A tournament began on 3 April 2005 in Maribor, Slovenia. Austria, France, Kazakhstan,  and Slovenia all returned to compete in this years Division I tournament after missing promotion to the Championship Division at the previous years World Championships. Great Britain gained promotion to Division I after finishing first in last years Division II Group B tournament and Belarus was relegated from the Championship Division after failing to survive the relegation round at the 2004 IIHF World U18 Championship.

Belarus won the tournament after winning four of their five games, finishing first in the group standings and gained promotion to the Championship Division for the 2006 IIHF World U18 Championships. Slovenia finished in second place and Kazakhstan finished third after only losing to Belarus and Slovenia. Great Britain finished in last place, managing only to win one game and lose the other four and were relegated back to Division II for the 2006 IIHF World U18 Championships. Anže Kopitar of Slovenia finished as the top scorer of the tournament with 11 points, including six goals and five assists. France's Mickael Gasnier and Belarus' Dzmitry Zhurauski finished as the tournaments leading goaltenders with a save percentage of 90.57.

Standings

Fixtures
All times local.

Scoring leaders

List shows the top ten skaters sorted by points, then goals.

Leading goaltenders
Only the top five goaltenders, based on save percentage, who have at least played 40% of their team's minutes are included in this list.

Group B tournament
The Group B tournament began on 2 April 2005 in Sosnowiec, Poland. Italy, Japan, Latvia and Poland all returned to compete in this years Division I tournament after missing promotion to the Championship Division at the previous years World Championships. Ukraine gained promotion to Division I after finishing first in last years Division II Group A tournament and Norway was relegated from the Championship Division after failing to survive the relegation round at the 2004 IIHF World U18 Championship.

Norway won the tournament after winning four of their five games, finishing first in the group standings and gained promotion back to the Championship Division for the 2006 IIHF World U18 Championships. Latvia finished second after losing only to Norway and Poland and Ukraine finished in third place. Italy finished in last place, managing only to tie two of their games and lose the other three and were relegated to Division II for the 2006 IIHF World U18 Championships. Grzegorz Pasiut of Poland finished as the top scorer of the tournament with seven points including six goals and one assist. Norway's Lars Simon Paulgaard finished as the tournaments leading goaltender with a save percentage of 92.50.

Standings

Fixtures
All times local.

Scoring leaders

List shows the top ten skaters sorted by points, then goals.

Leading goaltenders
Only the top five goaltenders, based on save percentage, who have played 40% of their team's minutes are included in this list.

References

World
World
2005 IIHF World U18 Championships
International ice hockey competitions hosted by Poland
International ice hockey competitions hosted by Slovenia
IIHF World U18 Championship Division I